Wolfpen Ridge is a ridge in the Blue Ridge Mountains in U.S. state of Georgia that runs south to north along the boundary between Towns and Union counties.  Brasstown Bald, the highest point in Georgia, is located at the northern end of the ridge.  At the southern end of the ridge, there is an unnamed peak with an elevation of 4,561 feet, which makes it the fifth-highest point in Georgia.

See also
List of mountains in Georgia (U.S. state)

Sources
 Georgia Above 4,000 Feet

External links
 TopoQuest Map for Wolfpen Ridge

Ridges of Georgia (U.S. state)
Landforms of Towns County, Georgia
Landforms of Union County, Georgia